Bradvek was a form of Tyvek polymer, produced by DuPont. It was used for printing one of the first polymer banknotes in 1983 for the Isle of Man by the American Banknote Company.

See also
Bradbury Wilkinson and Company

References

Polyolefins